Andriy Viktorovych Zadorozhny (born 21 May 1968 in Kyiv) is a Ukrainian lawyer and human rights activist. People's Deputy of Ukraine of the 9th convocation from the Servant of the People.

Biography 
Candidate for People's Deputies from the Servant of the People party in the 2019 parliamentary elections, № 119 on the list. At the time of the election: Director of Proxen Law Firm, non-partisan, living in Kyiv.

He graduated from the Faculty of International Law at the Institute of International Relations of the Taras Shevchenko National University of Kyiv, obtained the qualification of an international lawyer and English translator.

Member of the Verkhovna Rada of Ukraine Committee on Environmental Policy and Nature Management.

Referens

Link 
.

Living people
1968 births
20th-century Ukrainian lawyers
Servant of the People (political party) politicians
Taras Shevchenko National University of Kyiv alumni
21st-century Ukrainian lawyers